Panaah is a Hindi drama television series dealing with female foeticide, that airs on DD National. It is written by Gajra Kottary.

Cast
 Shweta Gulati as Shona
 Micky Dudani
 Saadhika Randhawa
 Nikhil Arya
 Saira Khan
 Reshma Modi
 Mithilesh Chaturvedi
 Muni Jha
 Niranjan Asrani

References

External links
Panaah Official Site on DD National

DD National original programming
Indian drama television series
Indian television series
Gulzar